Clemens C. J. Roothaan (August 29, 1918 – June 17, 2019) was a Dutch physicist and chemist known for his development of the self-consistent field theory of molecular structure.

Biography
Roothaan was born in Nijmegen. He enrolled TU Delft in 1935 to study electrical engineering. During World War II he was first detained in a prisoner of war camp. Later he and his brother were sent to the Vught concentration camp for involvement with the Dutch Resistance. On September 5, 1944, the remaining prisoners of the camp (including the Roothaan brothers) were moved to the Sachsenhausen camp in Germany ahead of the advancing Allies. Near the end of the war, the Sachsenhausen inmates were sent on a death march which Roothaan's brother did not survive.

While a prisoner of war he was able to pursue his studies in physics together with other professors and students under the formal guidance of Philips. The work he was assigned to while cooperating with Philips was a foundation for his master's thesis. He obtained his master's degree in physics from TU Delft on October 14, 1945. After that he moved to USA, where he did his PhD thesis with Robert S. Mulliken from the University of Chicago, on semiempirical MO theory, while holding a post at The Catholic University of America in Washington, D.C.. He realised that the then current approach to molecular orbital theory was incorrect and changed his topic to what resulted in the development of the Roothaan equations. Prof. Mulliken mentions this work in his Nobel lecture as follows:

He had moved to the University of Chicago in 1949 and his PhD was awarded in 1950. He then joined the Physics Department of the University of Chicago. From 1962 to 1968 he was Director of the University of Chicago Computation Center. Later he was Professor of Physics and Chemistry at the University of Chicago. Since his retirement, in 1988, he has worked for the Hewlett-Packard Laboratories in Palo Alto, California, where his primary contribution has been in the development of the mathematical coprocessor routines for the Itanium chip. His method of analyzing pipeline architecture has been unique and innovative and greatly admired in supercomputer circles around the world.

In 1982 Roothaan became a correspondent of the Royal Netherlands Academy of Arts and Sciences. He was a member of the International Academy of Quantum Molecular Science and the Society of Catholic Scientists. He turned 100 in August 2018 and died in June 2019.

Works

Autobiographies

See also
Restricted open-shell Hartree–Fock

References

External links 
 

1918 births
2019 deaths
Dutch centenarians
Men centenarians
20th-century Dutch physicists
Dutch emigrants to the United States
Dutch Roman Catholics
Catholic University of America faculty
Members of the International Academy of Quantum Molecular Science
University of Chicago alumni
University of Chicago faculty
Delft University of Technology alumni
People from Nijmegen
Theoretical chemists
Members of the Royal Netherlands Academy of Arts and Sciences
Computational chemists